La Mouette is a French aircraft manufacturer headquartered in Fontaine-lès-Dijon. The company specializes in the design and manufacture of hang gliders, paragliders and ultralight trikes. At one time they also produced paramotors.

Founded in 1974 by brothers Gérard Thevenot and Jean-Marc Thevenot, the company was formed to produce versions of the American Seagull hang glider. Their glider was named La Mouette, after which the company was named. In 1979 they produced the La Mouette Atlas which remained in production through 2012 and of which there are over 8000 examples flying.

In 1986 the company started building paramotors and in 1995 introduced the "topless" hang glider, deleting the kingpost and upper flying wires.

In 2010-11 the company developed an electric aircraft, the Samson.

The company also built a rigid wing hang glider, the Tsunami and a powered parachute, the Skydancer under the brand Helite. Helite is today a company that specializes in air bag designs.

Aircraft

References

External links

Aircraft manufacturers of France
Hang gliders
Companies based in Bourgogne-Franche-Comté